The quebracho crested tinamou (Eudromia formosa) is a species of tinamou found in dry forest habitats in Paraguay and northern Argentina in South America.

Taxonomy

Etymology
Eudromia comes from two Greek words, eu meaning well or nicely, and dromos meaning a running escape. These definitions together mean, nice running escape, which refers to their habit of escaping predators by running.
All tinamou are from the family Tinamidae, and in the larger scheme are also ratites. Unlike other ratites, tinamous can fly, although in general, they are not strong fliers. All ratites evolved from prehistoric flying birds, and tinamous are the closest living relative of these birds.

Subspecies
There are two subspecies of this tinamou:

 E. f. formosa, the nominate race, occurs in the arid quebracho woodlands in northern Argentina.
 E. f. mira occurs in the arid chaco of Paraguay and northwestern Argentina.

Description
Its upper parts are greyish-brown to blackish with a few scattered small white spots. Its lower parts are pale buffish to whitish and heavily barred with black. Its head has a black crest that is long, thin, and straight. It has a dusky stripe behind eye, bordered above and below by white stripes.

Distribution and habitat
It is also found in dry savanna. Its range is northern Argentina and Paraguay.

Behavior
Like other tinamous, the quebracho crested tinamou eats fruit off the ground or low-lying bushes. They also eat small amounts of invertebrates, flower buds, tender leaves, seeds, and roots. The male incubates the eggs which may come from as many as 4 different females, and then will raise them until they are ready to be on their own, usually 2–3 weeks. The nest is located on the ground in dense brush or between raised root buttresses.

Conservation

Footnotes

References
 
 
 
 
 
 

Birds described in 1905
Birds of Argentina
Birds of Paraguay
Eudromia
Tinamous of South America